Grevillea maxwellii is a species of flowering plant in the family Proteaceae and is endemic to the south west region of Western Australia. It is low-lying to spreading shrub divided leaves with linear, sharply-pointed lobes, and clusters of pinkish-orange to pinkish-red flowers with a deep pinkish red style.

Description

Taxonomy
Grevillea maxwellii  was first formally described by Donald McGillivray in 1986, his description published in  New Names in Grevillea (Proteaceae) from specimens collected near the Salt River (now known as the Pallinup River) by George Maxwell. The specific epithet (maxwellii) honours the collector of the type specimens.

Distribution and habitat
This grevillea grows in low heath, often in rocky places and is found in the catchment of the Pallinup River in the Esperance Plains bioregion of south-western Western Australia.

Conservation status
Grevillea maxwellii is listed as "Threatened" by the Western Australian Government Department of Biodiversity, Conservation and Attractions, meaning that they are in danger of extinction.

References

maxwellii
Eudicots of Western Australia
Proteales of Australia
Taxa named by Donald McGillivray
Plants described in 1986